Lavale is a neighbourhood on the outskirts of the city of Pune, India. Lavale hosts the campuses of Symbiosis International University, SUHRC Symbiosis University Hospital & Research Centre, Flame University, Bharati Vidyapeeth, and Lupin Pharmaceuticals.

Lavale is known for the cultivation of various crops like onion, rice, jamar, potatoes, and other vegetables. Guava is the most cultivated fruit. The atmosphere of the village and its surroundings is mostly cooler than that of the city. The Mula river passes through this region, and flowing through Wakad and Baner areas as it makes its way to Pune.

References 

Villages in Pune district